Going the Distance is a 2010 American romantic comedy film directed by Nanette Burstein, written by Geoff LaTulippe, and starring Drew Barrymore and Justin Long. It follows a young couple, who fall in love one summer in New York City and try to keep their long-distance relationship alive, when the woman heads home to San Francisco.

Plot
Erin Langford is a graduate journalism student recently hired as a summer intern at a NYC newspaper. Out with a friend at a bar, she meets Garrett, who interrupts her game of Centipede. They drink together and end up at his place, where they smoke pot and have sex while Garrett's roommate Dan "DJs their hook up". The next morning, before she can leave, Erin agrees to have breakfast with him. Telling him she is only in the city for six weeks, they agree to keep it casual.

Erin and Garrett soon develop feelings for each other, and she tries to get a permanent position at the paper. Before the end of her internship, she writes a well-received article and is told to contact them in January regarding possible job openings. Working for a record label, Garett is assigned to manage a band he dislikes, and he begins to hate his job.

When Erin's six weeks are over, she and Garrett find it difficult to let go. After driving her to the airport and saying goodbye, Garrett runs after her, admitting that he is crazy about her and wants to have a long-distance relationship, to which she agrees.
 
Over the following months, Erin and Garrett spend their free time trying to figure out when they can see each other. He gives her a surprise visit on Thanksgiving. After an emotional reunion, they go to Erin's sister Corrine's house, where she is staying, and start to have passionate sex on the dining room table. Unbeknownst to them, Erin's brother-in-law Phil is having dinner, and Corrine walks in on the awkward scene. The next day, they see The Boxer Rebellion perform, but Garrett is jealous Erin is friends with Damon, a handsome bartender, and eventually has to return to NYC.

In January, Erin calls her former boss, but they are not hiring. Unable to find comfort in a phone conversation with Garrett, she gets drunk with Damon and almost kisses him, but goes home. Her professor recommends her for a position at the San Francisco Chronicle and she goes for an interview. Garrett tries to have phone sex with Erin, but it ends up being awkward, leaving both feeling ridiculous.
 
A month later, while Erin is packing for a weekend in NYC, she gets a call from the Chronicle and is offered the job. Upon arriving in New York, she tells Garrett about the job offer, blindsiding Garrett with the news. Their happy reunion quickly devolves into a fight, causing Erin to spend the first night of her trip at a friend's. They make up the next day, and he calls her a week later saying he wants her to move to NYC, live together and start afresh. She agrees, but while visiting San Francisco to sort things out, a conversation with Corrine makes Garrett realize he shouldn't be the reason Erin turns down the job, and they part ways after an emotional conversation and a long hug at the airport.

Six months later, Erin's career is going well, having written her first front-page story. Garrett has not been with anyone since her, and quits his job to manage The Boxer Rebellion. He sends Erin tickets to their show and she goes, unaware he is the band manager. At the concert he reveals he has moved to LA, only several hours from San Francisco, and they seize another chance at a relationship. Late that night they go back to Corrine's, interrupting her and Phil dry humping on the dining room table. The film ends as Erin's niece, Maya, enters during the awkward moment, and they all scream "Maya! Statue!" – what Corrine, Phil, Erin & Garrett yell at her to freeze.

Cast

 Drew Barrymore as Erin Rankin Langford
 Justin Long as Garrett Scully
 Charlie Day as Dan Grant
 Jason Sudeikis as Box Saunders
 Christina Applegate as Corrine Berlin
 Kelli Garner as Brianna Jutsum
 Natalie Morales as Brandy
 June Diane Raphael as Karen Surgeoner
 Ron Livingston as Will Broderick
 Rob Riggle as Ron Surgeoner
 Leighton Meester as Amy
 Jim Gaffigan as Phil Berlin
 Kristen Schaal as Female Bartender
 Sarah Burns as Harper
 Matt Servitto as Hugh O'Keefe
 Maria Di Angelis as Receptionist
 Meredith Hagner as Tanning salon employee
 Oliver Jackson-Cohen as Damon
 Mick Hazen as Zeff
 Mike Birbiglia as Waiter

Soundtrack

 Generationals: "Either Way"
 Georgie James: "Places"
 Katie Herzig: "Hey Na Na"
 Albert Hammond Jr.: "In Transit"
 The Cure: "Just Like Heaven"
 The Pretenders: "Don't Get Me Wrong"
 The Boxer Rebellion: "Spitting Fire"
 Cat Power: "Could We"
 Band of Skulls: "Cold Fame"
 Eels: "Prizefighter"
 Passion Pit: "The Reeling" (Groove Police Remix)
 Fanfarlo: "Harold T. Wilkins, or How to Wait for a Very Long Time"
 The Replacements: "Here Comes a Regular"
 The Boxer Rebellion: "If You Run"
 Gotye: "Learnalilgivinanlovin"
 The Airborne Toxic Event: "Half of Something Else"

Three additional songs can be accessed through a link on the CD and on the digital deluxe version:
 The Boxer Rebellion – "Evacuate"
 Joe Purdy – "Miss Me"
 Edward Sharpe and the Magnetic Zeros – "40 Day Dream"

Release
Initially, the film was to be released domestically on August 27, 2010, amid weak reviews, but Warner Bros. decided to push back the release date one week to September 3. This meant its opening weekend would coincide with the Labor Day weekend. Dan Fellman, Warner Bros. Domestic Distribution President, stated that "moving to the Labor Day weekend not only allows us to take advantage of the long holiday weekend, but gives us some distance from the other female-driven films releasing in August." Eventually, Going the Distance′s earliest release was on September 2, 2010, in eight countries including Australia, Argentina and Germany, one day before its North American release.

Box office
The film opened in 3,030 theaters in the United States and Canada on September 3, 2010, and grossed $6,884,964 in its opening weekend, ranking 5th at the box office behind The American, Machete, Takers and The Last Exorcism. The film eventually grossed $17,804,299 in North America, ranking 120th domestically for 2010. In foreign markets the film grossed $24,248,458, for a total worldwide box office of $42,052,757, which made it the 118th highest-grossing film of 2010.

Critical response
On Rotten Tomatoes, the film holds an approval rating of 54% based on 166 reviews, with an average rating of 5.75/10. The site's critical consensus states: "It's timelier and a little more honest than most romantic comedies, but Drew Barrymore and Justin Long's screen chemistry doesn't make up for Going the Distances overall flatness and convoluted story." On Metacritic, the film holds a weighted average score of 51 out of 100, based on 31 critics, indicating "mixed or average reviews". Audiences polled by CinemaScore gave the film an average grade of "B" on an A+ to F scale.

USA Today′s Claudia Puig panned the writing, stating that "this premise, with better writing, could have made a much more compelling movie", and Lou Lumenick of the New York Post wondered "exactly at what audience the filmmakers thought they were aiming".

A. O. Scott of The New York Times said the film "acknowledges both the difficulty and the comic potential of the arrangement, and does so with enough insight and charm to make you wonder why frequent-flier love is not a more popular theme in romantic comedies", while Michael O'Sullivan of The Washington Post described it as "filthy, funny and kind of sweet". Tom Long of The Detroit News stated that the film's "constant raunch factor balances out its romantic center in a way that will likely surprise and please many", and Mick LaSalle of the San Francisco Chronicle that it "captures the harshness and the sweetness of our time". Carrie Rickey of The Philadelphia Inquirer said "the film gets many things so right about the conflicts faced by a two-career couple looking for work in a shrinking economy", and Owen Gleiberman of Entertainment Weekly that the film is "the rare romantic comedy in which you can actually believe what you're seeing". Linda Barnard, film critic for Toronto Star, said that the film "is a reminder of the sorry state of the rom-com, where gross scenes and easy-to-write trash talk have replaced smart dialogue". Michael Phillips of the Chicago Tribune stated that "Geoff LaTulippe's story of a recession-era long-distance relationship and its hurdles takes its characters seriously", also praising Barrymore's performance, for whom The Boston Globe'''s film critic Wesley Morris said that "is becoming a serious comedic actor".

Justin Chang of Variety describes the film as "a bicoastal comedy with a bit of a bipolar disorder", while Kirk Honeycutt of The Hollywood Reporter panned the film and screenwriting implying that it is a "romantic comedy [which is] going wrong in so many different ways". Peter Travers, writing for Rolling Stone'', concluded that "Barrymore and Long are both appealing, but not enough to sustain audience interest in the cinematic equivalent of dry-humping".

References

External links
 
 
 
 
 

2010 films
2010 romantic comedy films
American romantic comedy films
Films directed by Nanette Burstein
Films scored by Mychael Danna
Films set in New York City
Films set in San Francisco
Films set in the San Francisco Bay Area
Films shot in San Francisco
New Line Cinema films
Warner Bros. films
2010s English-language films
2010s American films